Hwekum is a village in Lahe Township, Naga Self-Administered Zone, in the Sagaing Region of northwestern Burma. It is located in a mountainous forest area to the northwest of Singkaling Hkamti. The village, close to the Indian border, has been subject to raids by the Ponyo Nagars, and since 2010 has been part of the new Naga-self-administered zone.

References

External links
Maplandia World Gazetteer

Populated places in Naga Self-Administered Zone
Lahe Township